Oleksandr Yevdokymovych Korniychuk<ref>Luckyj, G. Oleksandr Korniychuk. Columbia Dictionary of Modern European Literature; 1980, p442</ref> (25 May[12 o.s.], 1905 – 14 May 1972) was a Ukrainian playwright, literary critic and state official (a Soviet Foreign Minister’s first deputy in 1943–1945).

His most notable works were plays such as Zahybel eskadry (The Death of the Squadron) (1933), Platon Krechet (1934), Bohdan Khmelnytsky (1938), his pro-collectivization comedy In the Steppes of Ukraine (1940), and The Front (1942). Korniychuk was a five-time Stalin Prize laureate  (1941, 1942, 1943, 1949, 1951) and is regarded as a major proponent of Socialist Realism in Soviet drama.

Korniychuk was the member of the Central Committee of the Soviet Communist Party (1952–1972) and the Chairman of the Supreme Soviet of the Ukrainian Soviet Socialist Republic (1947–1953, 1959–1972).

Biography
Oleksandr Yevdokymovych Korniychuk was born in Khrystynivka, Kiev Governorate, into a family of a railroad worker. At the age of 15 he started working at a railroad carriage repair works. In 1924 Korniychuk enrolled into the Kyiv University (then known as the Kiev Institute of People's Education). After the graduation in 1929 he went to work in the Odessa and Kiev film studios, mainly as a script-writer. His debut play On the Edge (1929) examined the role of a man of arts in the new Socialist society. In the late 1920s - early 1930s Korniychuk was an active propagator of internationalism, strictly opposing the local National Communist movement in the Ukrainian literature, led by Mykola Khvylovy.

In 1933 came out the first significant play by Korniychuk, Death of the Squadron, endorsing the heroic tale of a Bolshevik Black Sea Fleet unit who chose to sink their ships so as not to be taken by the Germans (later revealed to be nothing more than a romantic revolutionary myth). The play impressed Pavel Postyshev, who became the 'local prodigy's mentor. Platon Krechet followed in 1934, its central character representing the 'new Soviet intelligentsia', driven by "humanism and justice-seeking". The 1937 play Pravda is credited for being the first one to introduce the character of Lenin to the Soviet theatre stage.

Both Nikita Khrushchev and Lazar Kaganovich recommended the young author to Stalin and in 1938 the Soviet leader met the playwright at the Kremlin. Soon Korniychuk's plays were translated into most of the Soviet republics' languages and started to be produced by theatres all over the country. In 1939 came out what in retrospect is regarded by Russian critics as Korniychuk's strongest work, the 5-act drama Bogdan Khmelnitsky, telling the story of the 17th-century national movement in the Ukraine which resulted in the country's unification with Russia. His 1941 pro-collectivisation farcical comedy In the Steppes of Ukraine became popular with both the general public and Stalin himself, who in a personal letter informed the author: "Comrade Korneychuk. Just read your play In the Steppes of Ukraine. Laughed heartily. I.Stalin". Korniychuk continued in the same vein with Please Come to Zvonkovoye (1946), The Kalinov Grove (1950) and Over Dnieper (1960).

In 1934, at the First Congress of the Soviet Union of Writers Korniychuk was elected a member of its chairmanship board. The same year he became the leader of the Ukrainian SSR Union of Writers (1934-1941, 1946-1953). As World War II broke out in 1941, Korniychuk went to the frontline, first as a war correspondent, then a politruk. His 1942 play Frontline, criticizing the 'old style' army generals caused outrage among the latter but was supported by Stalin ("Conduct the war in better ways and there won't be such plays," he reportedly told some of the disgruntled senior rank military men). For it the author received his third Stalin Prize, promptly donating the money to the needs of national defense.

On 19 February 1943 the Ukrainian government newspaper Radyans'ka Ukraina in (briefly) liberated Kharkov published an article by Korniychuk making it clear Stalin had no intention of giving up most of the territory gained by the Molotov-Ribbentrop pact after the war: it was promptly reprinted in Russian by Pravda the following day.  In 1944 Korniychuk became the first head (People's Comissar) of the Ukrainian SSR's newly formed Foreign Ministry (Narodny Comissariat, as it was then known). In 1943-1945 he was the first deputy of the Foreign Minister of the USSR. In the late 1940s

Korniychuk joined the higher ranks of the Ukrainian and Soviet political nomenclature. He was a member of the Communist Party’s Central committees (USSR - 1949-1972, UkrSSR - 1952-1972), a Supreme Soviet of the Soviet Union deputy (1937-1972), the first deputy of the UkrSSR Prime Minister (1953-1954), the Chairman of the Ukrainian parliament (in 1947-1953, 1959-1972).

Korniychuk received his share of ideological chastising too. In 1951 the libretto for Konstantyn Dankevych's opera Bogdan Khmelnitsky he'd written with his wife Wanda Wasilewska met with harsh disapproval from Stalin, who demanded for a lot more of the Ukrainian people's fight against the "Polish oppression" to be shown. The pair added several scenes, making a point to emphasize the "historical roots of the Russian-Ukrainian friendship," and the opera was premiered in 1953. In 1954 Korniychuk's play Wings, satirizing the style of local party officials' leadership, outraged some members of the USSR CP Central Committee. Khrushchev had to intervene, allegedly saying: "The Tsar hadn't banned Gogol's Revizor, how can we then ban Korneychuk's Wings?"

Korniychuk's works of the 1960s showed less ideological fervour and more psychological depth, dealing with the Soviet people's moral dilemmas in the post-War Soviet Russia.

Olexandr Korniychuk died on 14 May 1972 in Kiev. He was buried at the Baikove Cemetery.

There is a street in Moscow named after Korniychuk (1976).

Plays
 On the Edge (Na Grani, 1926)
 The Stone Island (Kamenny ostrov, 1930)
 The Assault (Shturm, 1930)
 Violet Pike (Fioletovaya shchuka, 1932)
 The Death of the Squadron (Gibel eskadry, 1933)
 Platon Kretchet (1934)
 The Banker (Bankir, 1936)
 Pravda (1937)
 Bogdan Khmelnitsky (1939)
 In the Steppes of Ukraine (V stepyakh Ukrayiny, 1942)
 Partisans in the Steppes of Ukraine (Partizany v stapyakh Ukrayiny, 1942)
 Frontline (Front, 1942)
 Mister Perkins’ Mission in the Bolshevik State (Missiya mistera Perkinsa v stranu bolshevikov, 1944)
 Please Come to Zvonkovoye (Priezjayte v Zvonkovoye, 1946)
 Makar Dubrava (1948)Kalinova Roshcha (1950)
 Wings (Krylya, 1954)
 Why Did Stars Smile (Potchemu ulybalis zvyozdy, 1957)
 Over Dnieper (Nad Dneprom, 1960)
 The Diary Page (Stranitsa dnevnika, 1964)
 The Cost to Pay (Rasplata, 1965)
 My Friends (Moyi druzyia, 1967)
 Memory of the Heart'' (Pamyat serdtsa, 1969)

References

External links 
 
 

1905 births
1972 deaths
People from Khrystynivka
People from Kiev Governorate
Ukrainian people in the Russian Empire
Central Committee of the Communist Party of the Soviet Union members
Politburo of the Central Committee of the Communist Party of Ukraine (Soviet Union) members
First convocation members of the Soviet of the Union
Second convocation members of the Soviet of the Union
Third convocation members of the Soviet of the Union
Fourth convocation members of the Soviet of the Union
Fifth convocation members of the Soviet of the Union
Sixth convocation members of the Soviet of Nationalities
Seventh convocation members of the Soviet of Nationalities
Eighth convocation members of the Soviet of Nationalities
First convocation members of the Verkhovna Rada of the Ukrainian Soviet Socialist Republic
20th-century Ukrainian politicians
Second convocation members of the Verkhovna Rada of the Ukrainian Soviet Socialist Republic
Third convocation members of the Verkhovna Rada of the Ukrainian Soviet Socialist Republic
Fourth convocation members of the Verkhovna Rada of the Ukrainian Soviet Socialist Republic
Fifth convocation members of the Verkhovna Rada of the Ukrainian Soviet Socialist Republic
Sixth convocation members of the Verkhovna Rada of the Ukrainian Soviet Socialist Republic
Seventh convocation members of the Verkhovna Rada of the Ukrainian Soviet Socialist Republic
Eighth convocation members of the Verkhovna Rada of the Ukrainian Soviet Socialist Republic
Chairmen of the Verkhovna Rada of the Ukrainian Soviet Socialist Republic
Soviet foreign ministers of Ukraine
Ambassador Extraordinary and Plenipotentiary (Soviet Union)
Ukrainian diplomats
First deputy chairpersons of the Council of Ministers of Ukraine
Ukrainian dramatists and playwrights
Ukrainian literary critics
Socialist realism writers
Members of the National Academy of Sciences of Ukraine
National Pedagogical Dragomanov University alumni
Stalin Prize winners
Heroes of Socialist Labour
Recipients of the Order of the Red Star
Recipients of the Order of the Red Banner
Recipients of the Order of Lenin
Lenin Peace Prize recipients
Recipients of the Shevchenko National Prize
20th-century dramatists and playwrights
Burials at Baikove Cemetery